South Carolina Highway 702 (SC 702) is a  primary state highway in the U.S. state of South Carolina. It serves as main access to Lake Greenwood State Park.

Route description

History

The current routing of SC 702 was created by 1952 and has remained unchanged since. It was originally established in 1940 as a loop off SC 7 west of Greenwood.  By 1942, SC 702 was extended east through Greenwood to SC 246, then southeast along the route it shares today to SC 39 north of Saluda. In 1948, SC 702 was reduced back to its original routing as a loop highway.  In 1950, what remained of SC 702 became part of SC 72. The roads between the loop and its current alignment: Cambridge Avenue (S-25-29), Siloam Church Road (S-24-101) and Vines Road (S-24-179), has remained as secondary roads.

Junction list

See also

References

External links

 
 Mapmikey's South Carolina Highways Page: SC 702

702
Transportation in Greenwood County, South Carolina
Transportation in Saluda County, South Carolina